Carole Alison James (born December 22, 1957) is a Canadian politician and former public administrator, who represented Victoria-Beacon Hill in the MLA from 2005 to 2020. She is the former Leader of the Opposition in British Columbia and former leader of the British Columbia New Democratic Party (NDP), a social democratic political party.  She announced her intention to resign as leader on December 6, 2010 and was officially replaced by interim leader Dawn Black on January 20, 2011.

James served as the 14th deputy premier of British Columbia and minister of Finance under John Horgan, from 2017 to 2020.

Background
James was born in Dukinfield, Cheshire, England, and raised in North Battleford, Saskatchewan, and in Victoria, British Columbia. After graduating from high school, James and her first husband worked in institutions for the developmentally disabled in Alberta and British Columbia. As a mother of young children, Alison and Evan, she became involved in a parents' group in Victoria, which led to her first foray into politics. James self-identifies as part Métis, and in 2004 married her long-time partner, Albert Gerow, a First Nations artist and former Burns Lake municipal councillor and Royal Canadian Mounted Police officer. Gerow was the chief of the Ts'il Kaz Koh First Nation in Burns Lake.

James has been a foster parent for over twenty years.

On July 13, 2006, James announced publicly that she had been diagnosed with localized uterine endometrial cancer. She underwent surgery and radiation treatment and her prognosis is considered to be excellent. In March 2020, James announced that she was diagnosed with Parkinson's disease and did not run in the 2020 British Columbia general election.

Early career
James served on the Greater Victoria School Board from 1990 to 2001, including seven terms as chair, and gained a province-wide profile in her unprecedented five terms as president of the BC School Trustees Association. She also served at the national level as vice-president of the Canadian School Boards Association. From 1999 to 2001, James held the position of director of child care policy for the British Columbia government. In addition, she served on several local and provincial panels and committees.

In 2001, James ran unsuccessfully for the NDP in the riding of Victoria-Beacon Hill only losing by 35 Votes to BC Liberal candidate Jeff Bray. She subsequently moved to Prince George, British Columbia to serve as the director of child and family services for Carrier Sekani Family Services, and later as co-ordinator of the Northern Aboriginal Authority for Families.

Political career

BC NDP leadership 
James was elected leader of the provincial NDP on November 23, 2003. At the time of her election the party was suffering low morale in the wake of the 2001 provincial election, which had reduced the NDP to only two seats in the Legislative Assembly. During her campaign to win the party leadership, James pledged to modernize the NDP's ideology and internal structures and build a broader base of support for the party, a move which alienated some traditional supporters.

During the 2005 provincial election, James campaigned heavily on her name and image. On election night James and the NDP surprised many supporters and critics alike with a very strong electoral showing; the party winning 41.52 per cent of the popular vote (a 19.96 per cent increase from the 2001 election result) and 33 out of 79 seats in the Legislative Assembly. James won her seat in the riding of Victoria-Beacon Hill with 57.01 per cent of the vote, defeating the incumbent BC Liberal MLA Jeff Bray by an almost 2-1 margin. She was re-elected in 2009, 2013, and 2017.

Leadership controversy and resignation
On December 1, 2010, Jenny Kwan, a prominent party member, released a statement to the media criticizing James' leadership of the New Democratic Party, and calling for an immediate leadership convention. In response to Kwan's statement, James called an emergency caucus session to address opposition to her continued leadership. While the session was meant to take place on December 5, it was later postponed so that private discussions could take place with a group of thirteen caucus members opposed to James' continued leadership.

On short notice on December 6, James announced she would resign the party's leadership. She continued in the position, however, until Dawn Black was chosen to act as Interim Leader.

James served as opposition Critic for Children and Family Development under her successor, Adrian Dix. She was promoted to the Finance portfolio under John Horgan, and was also named deputy leader of the BC NDP and hence Deputy Leader of the Opposition.

In government 
When the BC NDP won a minority government in 2017, James became deputy premier and Finance minister. She resigned from both positions in 2020, shortly after leaving the provincial legislature.

Notes

References

External links
Official Biography, BC Legislative Assembly
Biography, Personal Page
A Conversation With Carole James

1957 births
Living people
British Columbia New Democratic Party MLAs
Canadian people of Métis descent
Deputy premiers of British Columbia
English emigrants to Canada
Female Canadian political party leaders
Finance ministers of British Columbia
Leaders of the British Columbia CCF/NDP
Members of the Executive Council of British Columbia
People from Dukinfield
Politicians from Victoria, British Columbia
Female finance ministers
Women government ministers of Canada
Women MLAs in British Columbia
21st-century Canadian politicians
21st-century Canadian women politicians
Métis politicians
Canadian expatriates in England